The Miri Family is an Lebanese Arab criminal organisation based in Europe. The clan consists of over 30 extended families who arrived in Germany in the 1980s as refugees from Lebanon. They are particularly prominent in Bremen, where they have around 3,600 members. 

The clan is said to have more than 10,000 members in Germany.

On 10 July 2019 GSG9 police officers escorted Ibrahim Miri (46) from his apartment in Bremen, flew him to Berlin in a Federal Police helicopter and deported him to Beirut.

They are active in all of Lower Saxony. It is estimated that, in the city of Bremen alone, the group makes approximately €50 million each year from drug-related crime.

The Lebanese Arab crime families are particularly active in Hannover, Hildesheim, Stade, Achim, Wilhelmshaven, Peine, Göttingen, Osnabrück, Braunschweig, Salzgitter, Hameln, Lüneburg and Delmenhorst.

They run the Mongols Motorcycle Club in Germany, and have challenged the Hells Angels. The Hells Angels president offered them €250,000 to join him.

On 30 January 2009 Hussein Al Zein was shot and his fiancée was seriously injured. Heisem Miri (the perpetrator) is now on the run and is suspected of being in the Middle East.

In July 2019, a Bandidos hairdresser was shot in Dortmund by a member of the Miri Family. The shooter has not yet been found. Since then, it has been comparatively quiet. Also in 2019, the rapper 18 Karat from the environment of the Miri Family was arrested after a shooting. Later he was released because he had an alibi. Previously, four brothers of the Miri Family had also been arrested by the police in Bochum.

References 

Organizations established in the 1990s
1990s establishments in Germany
Organised crime groups in Germany
Mongols Motorcycle Club
Mhallami gangs
Middle Eastern gangs